Richard Trevor Turner-Warwick  (21 February 1925 – 19 September 2020) was a British urologist who was internationally known for his work on the surgical restoration of the structure and function of the genitourinary tract. He introduced video-cysto-urethrography.

After studying medicine at Oriel College, Oxford, where he was president of its boat club during the year that it won The Boat Race, he completed his pre-clinical training at the Middlesex Hospital. During the 1950s he rotated through several medical and surgical specialties including urology with Sir Eric Riches and Sir David Innes Williams at the Institute of Urology in London. In 1958 he won the Leopold Hudson Travelling Fellowship that enabled him to be appointed to a research position at Colombia Presbyterian Delafield Hospital. Subsequently he became one of six consultant general surgeons to the Middlesex Hospital, where he also looked after the thyroid clinic and developed his trephine biopsy instrument. In 1963, he took over the hospital's urological department, succeeding Sir Eric.

In 1977 Turner-Warwick was elected to be the Hunterian Professor of the Royal College of Surgeons.

Early life and education
Richard Trevor Turner-Warwick was born on 21 February 1925, to William, a consultant surgeon at the Middlesex Hospital who specialised in colonic surgery and in varicose veins, and Joan (née Harris), a doctor and member of the Royal College of Physicians who specialised in women and children's welfare clinics in London’s East End. His grandfather was a dentist.

After deciding from an early age that he wished to be a physician, he attended Bedales School in Petersfield, before matriculating to read medicine at Oriel College, Oxford in 1942. At Oxford he completed an honours degree in natural science. In the third year, he was offered an additional year of education by the anatomist surgeon, primatologist and palaeoanthropologist Wilfrid Le Gros Clark, who held the chair of the Anatomy Department. Thus he spent a fourth year at Oxford as an anatomy demonstrator, working on nerves relating to smell in rabbits and writing an MSc thesis.

While at Oxford, he became a skilled rower. In his third year he became captain of the Oxford University Boat Club and was elected its president in 1946, the same year they won The Boat Race, the first after the war.

Career

Turner-Warwick completed his pre-clinical training at the Middlesex Hospital, where he was a Broderip scholar. In 1954 he gained a Fellowship of the Royal Colleges of Surgeons and the following year obtained his MRCP, his Oxford Doctorate of Medicine a further two years later, and his Oxford Mastership of Surgery in 1962. In 1958 he won the Leopold Hudson Travelling Fellowship that enabled him to be appointed to a research position at Colombia Presbyterian Delafield Hospital.

By 1960 he had rotated through the specialties of internal medicine, pathology, gastroenterology, respiratory medicine, gynaecology and plastic surgery. In addition he trained in urology under Sir Eric Riches and Sir David Innes Williams at the Institute of Urology in London. Subsequently he became one of six consultant general surgeons to the Middlesex Hospital, where he also looked after the thyroid clinic with Deborah Doniach and where he developed his trephine biopsy instrument. In 1963, he took over the hospital's urological department, succeeding Sir Eric.

He created a urodynamic unit and introduced video-cysto-urethrography in combination with measuring of pressure and flow voiding dynamics.

Awards and honours
In 1977 Turner-Warwick was elected to be the Hunterian Professor of the Royal College of Surgeons. the following year he was a recipient of the St Peter's Medal awarded by the BAUS.

In 1987 he was awarded the Victor Bonney prize from the Royal College of Obstetricians and Gynaecologists. In 1991, he was awarded the Valentine Gold Medal of the New York Academy of Medicine. The Gordon Watson Medal was awarded the following year, from the RCS. In 2002 he received the William Didusch award that is awarded annually to recognise contributions to urological art.

In 2005 he was awarded the EAU Willy Gregoir Medal. In 2017 he received the EAU Innovators in Urology Medal. He was listed honorary medical staff at King Edward VII's Hospital for Officers.

Personal and family
It was at Oxford in 1943 that Turner-Warwick met his future wife, Margaret Turner-Warwick, (later Dame), who was a medical student at Lady Margaret Hall. They were married at St Dunstan-in-the-West in 1950, the same year they both qualified. Dame Margaret Turner-Warwick would eventually become an internationally recognised thoracic physician. They had two daughters, Lynne who became a professor of medicine and Gillian who became an artist and teacher.

Death
Turner-Warwick died on 19 September 2020 at the age of 95. He was predeceased by his wife Margaret, who died on 21 August 2017.

Selected publications

Articles

Books
  This book is available for free online per Mr. Richard Turner-Warwicks request at rturnerwarwick.com

References

External links

Richard Turner-Warwick articles on PubMed

1925 births
2020 deaths
20th-century British medical doctors
Alumni of Oriel College, Oxford
British urologists
Commanders of the Order of the British Empire
Fellows of the Royal College of Obstetricians and Gynaecologists
Fellows of the Royal College of Physicians
Fellows of the Royal College of Surgeons
People educated at Bedales School
Medical doctors from Exeter
Recipients of the St Peter's Medal